Julio Alberto Mosquera Cervantes (born January 29, 1972) is a Panamanian professional baseball player and coach. Mosquera is currently the acting manager of the Charlotte Knights. He played in Major League Baseball as a catcher for the Toronto Blue Jays (–) and Milwaukee Brewers.

Playing career

Mosquera signed with the Blue Jays as an amateur free agent in 1991, and in 1993 he made his American debut with the GCL Blue Jays. Mosquera spoke no English at the time, making mundane tasks such as ordering food challenging for him. He was called up to the majors on August 17, 1996, after Blue Jays catcher Sandy Martinez suffered a sprained ankle in a game against the Minnesota Twins and was placed on the disabled list. He also appeared in three games with the Blue Jays in April of the following year. Mosquera's final stint in the major leagues came with the Milwaukee Brewers on June 6, 2005, as a temporary replacement for catcher Damian Miller, who had suffered a strained groin. 

Over his 12 games in the major leagues, Mosquera had 31 at bats, 2 runs, 7 hits, 3 doubles, 2 RBI, .226 batting average, .250 on-base percentage, .323 slugging percentage and 10 total bases.

Coaching career

Mosquera worked as a minor league manager for the Staten Island Yankees, and then moved up to the Class-A Charleston RiverDogs of the South Atlantic League. He previously served as a catching coach where he instructed Austin Romine and Jesús Montero. 

Mosquera served as the manager for the Astronautas de Chiriquí, the team representing Panama, during the 2020 Caribbean Series. The Astronautas finished with a record of 1 – 4, and did not advance to the knockout stage.

On January 27, 2020, the Yankees announced that Mosquera would become the manager for the class Double-A Trenton Thunder. However, he never ended up assuming those duties, as the 2020 minor league baseball season was cancelled due to the COVID-19 pandemic, and the Yankees subsequently ended their affiliation with Trenton in favor of the Somerset Patriots. Instead, Mosquera served under Aaron Boone as part of the coaching staff of the Yankees during the 2020 season. Mosquera managed the Double-A Somerset Patriots in 2021.

Mosquera joined the Chicago White Sox organization as a catching instructor before the 2022 season. On May 20, the White Sox put Wes Helms, the manager of the Triple-A Charlotte Knights, on an indefinite leave of absence and named Mosquera the acting manager of the Knights.

References

External links

1972 births
Living people
Hagerstown Suns players
Major League Baseball catchers
Major League Baseball players from Panama
Milwaukee Brewers players
Nashville Sounds players
Newark Bears players
Panamanian expatriate baseball players in Canada
Panamanian expatriate baseball players in the United States
Sportspeople from Panama City
Caribbean Series managers
Tacoma Rainiers players
Toronto Blue Jays players
Columbus Clippers players
Frisco RoughRiders players
Gulf Coast Blue Jays players
Knoxville Smokies players
Medicine Hat Blue Jays players
Norwich Navigators players
Oklahoma RedHawks players
Orlando Rays players
Panamanian expatriate baseball players in Mexico
Piratas de Campeche players
Savannah Sand Gnats players
Syracuse Chiefs players
Syracuse SkyChiefs players
Tulsa Drillers players